Ambient lighting may refer to:

 Available light in an environment
 Low-key lighting, a photographic technique using a single key light
 A type of lighting in computer graphics

See also 
 Ambient light sensor
 Ambiance lighting, lighting for mood